Diamond Safari (French: Safari diamants, German: Für eine Handvoll Diamanten) is a 1966 French-West German thriller film directed by Michel Drach and starring Marie-José Nat, Jean-Louis Trintignant and Horst Frank. A young man becomes involved with a gang of diamond-smugglers.

Cast
 Marie-José Nat as Electre 
 Jean-Louis Trintignant as Raphaële Vincente 
 Horst Frank as Fédérico 
 Hellmut Lange as Robert Alphène 
 Jean-Pierre Kalfon as Éric 
 Jean-Pierre Darras as Pascal Moratti 
 Frédéric de Pasquale as Le routier 
 Lucienne Bogaert as La vieille dame sur le banc 
 Paul Le Person as Joseph

References

External links

1966 films
West German films
German thriller films
French thriller films
1960s thriller films
1960s French-language films
Films directed by Michel Drach
1960s French films
1960s German films